Målerås is a locality situated in Nybro Municipality, Kalmar County, Sweden with 211 inhabitants in 2010.

References

External links

Populated places in Kalmar County
Populated places in Nybro Municipality
Värend